The Yale Jackson School of Global Affairs (formerly the Yale University Jackson Institute for Global Affairs) is a professional school of Yale University that specializes in global affairs.

Based in New Haven, Connecticut, the school's mission is to "inspire and prepare Yale students for global leadership and service." It was established in 2010 and offers degrees for both undergraduate and graduate levels and includes the following programs: the Kerry Initiative, the Global Health Studies Program, the Yale World Fellows, and the Leitner Program on Effective Democratic Governance. It also hosts the Johnson Center for the Study of American Diplomacy. As of 2022, the school is led by dean James A. Levinsohn, Charles W. Goodyear Professor in Global Affairs. The Jackson Institute transitioned to a professional school in 2022. It is the first new Yale professional school created since 1976.

Office
The Jackson School of Global Affairs is located in Horchow Hall on New Haven's historic Hillhouse Avenue. The building formerly housed the Yale School of Management.

Academics 
The school offers degrees for both undergraduate, graduate, and mid-career professionals.

Freshman to Yale College can apply under a competitive admission to be considered for the Global Affairs major, where around 60 students per class are selected. The major provides an interdisciplinary curriculum to supply students with social science research tools to solve global issues. A requirement of the major is the Capstone Course, undertaken in the fall of senior year, which students complete a project on behalf of a real client and under supervision of a faculty member; this replaces the traditional senior thesis completed by other Yale seniors.

Graduate students can apply for a Master's in Global Affairs, where around 25 - 30 students are selected. Each student undertakes their own individualized course selection, allowing them to study from Yale faculty for all disciplines; in addition, students can also listen to seminars provided by Senior Fellows. The degree is different from one offered by most other similar institutions, in which it prepares students for a professional environment, rather than an academic one.

Created in 2013, the Master of Advanced Study in Global Affairs is a one-year program for mid-career professionals, which enrolls only around a few students each year. The program is centered for those with at least seven years of professional experience in global affairs. The degree functions as a multi-disciplinary, rigorous academic program.

Foundation and history  
In April 2009, Yale announced it had received a $50 million gift to create the Jackson Institute for Global Affairs. In the fall of 2010, the university officially opened the institute in Rosenkranz Hall. The donation came from ex-pharmaceutical businessman and philanthropist John Jackson, a 1967 graduate of Yale College, and his wife, Susan. Jackson said he originally intended to become a diplomat when entering Yale, like his great-grandfather. Regarding the gift, Jackson stated, "We hope to inspire students to pursue careers in diplomacy and public service and to become globally engaged leaders in all walks of life." Yale President Richard Levin added, "The Jackson Institute will become a signature program, marking Yale's global aspirations. Its teaching programs will permeate the University, expanding the curriculum in international affairs so that students in all its schools are better prepared for global leadership and service."

In 2010, shortly after the institute opened, Yale College faculty introduced the Global Affairs major, replacing the previous international studies major. While the international studies major could only be completed as a second major, the Global Affairs could be completed as a standalone major.

On April 6, 2019, Yale President Peter Salovey formally announced to the Yale community that the Jackson Institute will transform itself to the Yale Jackson School of Global Affairs by 2022. The announcement came after a decision by the Yale Corporation. This decision stemmed from a report of a committee chaired by Professor Judith Chevalier, William S. Beinecke Professor of Economics and Finance at the Yale School of Management, who recommended the formation of a school of global affairs in a report made public in November 2018.

Programs and centers 

 Maurice R. Greenberg World Fellows Program
 Kerry Initiative
 Global Health Studies Program
 International Security Studies & Brady-Johnson Program in Grand Strategy
 Johnson Center for the Study of American Diplomacy
 Leitner Program on Effective Democratic Governance

Senior Fellows
A key component of the Jackson Institute is its Senior Fellows, which the Jackson Institute describes as, "leading practitioners in government, business, international organizations, the NGO community, and other global affairs fields." Senior Fellows spend either a semester or full academic year at Yale teaching and mentoring students, although some continue to serve for multiple years.

The following table includes current and former Senior Fellows:

See also 

 Yale University
 MacMillan Center for International and Area Studies

References

External links 

 Official Website

Yale University
2010 establishments in Connecticut
Educational institutions established in 2010